The Tejano Music Award for Male Entertainer of the Year is an honor presented annually by the Texas Talent Musicians Association (TTMA). The Tejano Music Awards were first awarded in 1981 and was established to recognize the most talented performers of Tejano music—a subgenre of regional Mexican music. The nominees were originally selected by a voting poll conducted among program directors and disc jockeys of Spanish-language radio stations in Texas. Originally, winners were chosen by Tejano radio station KIWW listeners, and later by fans of Tejano musicians in the Southwest of the United States. Winners are selected through a survey of 50,000 Texas households with Hispanic surnames. By 1987, the award ceremony was broadcast through 32 radio stations and 25 local television channels in Texas, New Mexico, Arkansas, Oklahoma and Louisiana. The awards ceremony were originally held at the Henry B. Gonzalez Convention Center, then to the San Antonio Convention Center until 1994, and the Alamodome until 1999. As of 2015, the ceremony is held annually at the Tobin Center for the Performing Arts in San Antonio, Texas.

The award was first presented to Roberto Pulido, who introduced country music and ballads to the traditional polka and ranchera music of Tejano. Beginning in 1982, Little Joe Hernandez dominated the award for three consecutive years until La Mafia's Oscar Gonzalez won for two consecutive years in 1985. Emilio Navaira, who is called the "King of Tejano music", holds the record for most wins at five. The award was disestablished following the 2006 Tejano Music Awards along with the Tejano Music Award for Female Entertainer of the Year and were merged into Tejano Music Award for Entertainer of the Year for the 2007 awards ceremony.

Winners and nominees
Listed below are the winners of the award for each year, as well as the other nominees.

References

Notes 
 - Read online, registration required

External links
Official site of the Tejano Music Awards

Male Entertainer of the Year
Awards established in 1981
Awards disestablished in 2007